The enzyme indole-3-glycerol-phosphate synthase (IGPS) catalyzes the chemical reaction

1-(2-carboxyphenylamino)-1-deoxy-D-ribulose 5-phosphate  1-C-(indol-3-yl)-glycerol 3-phosphate + CO2 + H2O

This enzyme belongs to the family of lyases, to be specific, the carboxy-lyases, which cleave carbon-carbon bonds.  The systematic name of this enzyme class is 1-(2-carboxyphenylamino)-1-deoxy-D-ribulose-5-phosphate carboxy-lyase [cyclizing 1-C-(indol-3-yl)glycerol-3-phosphate-forming]. Other names in common use include indoleglycerol phosphate synthetase, indoleglycerol phosphate synthase, indole-3-glycerophosphate synthase, 1-(2-carboxyphenylamino)-1-deoxy-D-ribulose-5-phosphate, and carboxy-lyase (cyclizing). This enzyme participates in phenylalanine, tyrosine and tryptophan biosynthesis and two-component system - general.  It employs one cofactor, pyruvate.

Structural studies

In some bacteria, IGPS is a single chain enzyme. In others, such as Escherichia coli, it is the N-terminal domain of a bifunctional enzyme that also catalyses N-(5'-phosphoribosyl)anthranilate isomerase (PRAI) activity, the third step of tryptophan biosynthesis. In fungi, IGPS is the central domain of a trifunctional enzyme that contains a PRAI C-terminal domain and a glutamine amidotransferase (GATase) N-terminal domain.

A structure of the IGPS domain of the bifunctional enzyme from the mesophilic bacterium E. coli (eIGPS) has been compared with the monomeric indole-3-glycerol phosphate synthase from the hyperthermophilic archaeon Sulfolobus solfataricus (sIGPS). Both are single-domain (beta/alpha)8 barrel proteins, with one (eIGPS) or two (sIGPS) additional helices inserted before the first beta strand.

References

Further reading
 
 
 

Protein domains
EC 4.1.1
Pyruvate enzymes
Enzymes of known structure